Inflation in Romania was a major issue during the 1990s, when the yearly inflation reached a peak of 256% in 1993. Since then, the inflation has slowly decreased, reaching a period of deflation in 2015.

For most of the Socialist era, inflation was relatively low, due to the centrally planned economy. Exceptions were at the beginning of the 1980s austerity policy in Romania, when prices were risen in order to reduce consumption and allow the government to pay back the foreign debt.

Following the onset of liberal economic reforms in November 1990, as prices and exchange rates were gradually liberalized, inflation began to rise. The inflation went down due to the economic growth, but in 1997, following the elimination of subsidies, a new inflation bout occurred.

Notes

External links 
 Raport asupra inflației, anul 1, nr. 1 - ianuarie - septembrie 2001, Banca Națională a României, ISSN 1582-2923

Romania
Economy of Romania